The Centre de services scolaire de l'Énergie is a francophone school service centre in the Mauricie region of Quebec, headquartered in Shawinigan.

The territory served is divide in 5 districts:

District Shawinigan-Grand-Mère
District Maskinongé.
District Mékinac
District Shawinigan-Sud-Mont-Carmel
District La Tuque

This includes 22 municipalities, three First Nations reserves, and four non-organized territories.

Schools

Primary and secondary
 École des Boisés (Saint-Alexis-des-Monts)
 École Notre-Dame-de-l'Assomption (Parent sector of La Tuque)

Secondary
 École secondaire Champagnat (La Tuque)
 École secondaire des Chutes (Shawinigan)
 École secondaire du Rocher (Shawinigan)
 École secondaire Paul-Le Jeune (Saint-Tite)
 École secondaire Val-Mauricie (Shawinigan)

Preschool and Primary
 Antoine-Hallé (Shawinigan)
 Centrale (La Tuque)
 de l'Énergie (Shawinigan)
 de la Passerelle (Notre-Dame-de-Montauban)
 de la Petite-Rivière (Shawinigan)
 de la Source (Shawinigan)
 de la Tortue-des-Bois (Saint-Mathieu-du-Parc)
 de Sainte-Flore (Shawinigan) 
 des Bâtisseurs (Shawinigan)
 des Explorateurs (Shawinigan)
 des Vallons (Saint-Paulin)
 Dominique-Savio (Shawinigan)
 Félix-Leclerc (Shawinigan)
 Immaculée-Conception (Shawinigan)
 Jacques-Buteux (La Tuque)
 Jacques-Cartier (Shawinigan)
 Jacques-Plante (Shawinigan)
 La Croisière (Saint-Séverin)
 La Providence (Saint-Tite)
 Laflèche (Shawinigan)
 Le Sablon d'Or (Lac-aux-Sables)
 Masson (Sainte-Thècle)
 Notre-Dame (Shawinigan)
 Notre-Dame (Notre-Dame-du-Mont-Carmel)
 Notre-Dame Preschool (Shawinigan)
 Notre-Dame-de-la-Joie (Saint-Barnabé Nord)
 Notre-Dame-des-Neiges (Charette)
 Plein Soleil (Hérouxville)
 Primadel (Saint-Adelphe)
 Saint-Charles-Garnier (Shawinigan)
 Sainte-Marie (Saint-Boniface)
 Saint-Jacques (Shawinigan)
 Saint-Joseph (Shawinigan)
 Saint-Paul (Shawinigan)
 Villa-de-la-Jeunesse (Saint-Élie-de-Caxton)

References

External links
 Commission scolaire de l'Énergie 

School districts in Quebec
Education in Mauricie